Porophoromyces is a genus of fungi in the family Laboulbeniaceae.

References

External links
Porophoromyces at Index Fungorum

Laboulbeniomycetes